Ashley Seeto (born 7 December 1987) is a Papua New Guinean swimmer. He competed in the men's 50 metre breaststroke event at the 2017 World Aquatics Championships. He also competed in six events for Papua New Guinea at the 2018 Commonwealth Games.

References

1987 births
Living people
Papua New Guinean male swimmers
Place of birth missing (living people)
Commonwealth Games competitors for Papua New Guinea
Swimmers at the 2018 Commonwealth Games
Male breaststroke swimmers